József Kóczián (4 August 1926 – 10 December 2009) was a Hungarian table tennis player, who won three world championships during his career.

Table tennis career
Following the Second World War, he made his first World Championships appearance in 1947 in Paris. He was a regular at the global event until 1959 when he made his final bow in Dortmund, Germany representing Sweden. József's sister Éva was also a table tennis player.

Medal Count
He won a total of 14 medals at World Championships during that 12-year period; notably clinching three gold medals. In 1949/Stockholm and 1952/Bombay he was a member of the successful Hungarian team that won the Swaythling Cup. In 1953 he partnered with fellow Hungarian Ferenc Sidó to clinch the top prize in the Men's Doubles competition.

See also
 List of table tennis players
 List of World Table Tennis Championships medalists

References

External links
Biodata

1926 births
2009 deaths
Hungarian male table tennis players
Table tennis players from Budapest
Place of birth missing
Place of death missing
World Table Tennis Championships medalists